The Vextra was a French armored vehicle classified as an armored reconnaissance vehicle, infantry fighting vehicle, fire support vehicle, and/or anti-tank vehicle. It is crewed by a four-person team consisting of a commander, a driver, a gunner, and a loader. It was developed in the early 1990s by GIAT industries, now Nexter Systems, and was revealed in 1997.

Description
The Vextra 105mm was  classified as an armored reconnaissance vehicle, fire support vehicle, and or anti-tank vehicle. It is crewed by a four-person team consisting of a commander, a driver, a gunner, and a loader It was developed in the early 1990s by former GIAT industries, now Nexter Systems, and was revealed in 1997. The Vextra 105mm was somewhat based on multiple preceding French armored vehicles of similar type. Aluminum armor was used to keep the tank as light as possible (weight was 28t - 33t depending on level of ballistic protection) which was also used on the AMX-10P IFV, an armored vehicle produced starting in 1973. The Vextra 105mm is also a wheeled vehicle, with an 8x8 chassis based on the Vextra IFV, a very similar prototype vehicle with the Dragar one man turret and a 25mm gun. The Vextra 105mm was aimed at both the French army and export customers, but after some successful trials in France, and many successful firepower tests in the United Arab Emirates, the vehicle still received no production orders.

The Vextra 105mm was equipped with a GIAT TLM 105mm three-man turret and GIAT G2 low recoil 105mm gun. The gun is compatible with NATO standard 105mm shells including armor-piercing fin-stabilized discarding sabot (APFSDS)
ammunition. The vehicle carries a total of 35 shells for the main armament 12 of which are stowed in the turret. The Vextra 105 is also equipped with coaxially mounted 7.62mm machine guns and the Galix close defense system. The Galix close defense system consists of four 80mm launchers on either side of the gun at front, and three on either side at the rear.
	 
With 16 total wide dimension tires, light aluminum armor, 600 hp Saab Scania diesel engine, and hydropneumatic suspension, the Vextra 105 can reach speeds of 120 km/h on road. The hydropneumatic suspension system uses large fluid filled spheres to internally compress, and absorb shock. This suspension system rather than one using springs makes for a smooth ride and  allows the Vextra 105 to traverse more difficult terrain.

The FINDERS system
A version of the FINDERS (Fast Information, Navigation, Decision and Reporting System) is installed in the Vextra 105mm and on the Leclerc main battle tank. Also developed by GIAT industries, the FINDERS system performs a variety of functions for their tanks, it displays a color map with positions of the host, allied, and hostile vehicle(s), designated targets, alphanumeric messages, many digital mapping options, communication options, and more.

Usage of wheeled chassis
At the time of the Vextra 105mm's testing, wheeled armored vehicles were manufactured and used substantially less than tracked vehicles as compared with the present. In many cases wheeled armored vehicles are without a gun/primary armament and are instead used for hauling troops. Tracked vehicles have been used in the military for more time, however recent use of wheeled chassis is increasing because wheeled vehicles are faster, more maneuverable, lighter, and wheeled systems are generally less complicated.

References

Armoured cars of France
Fire support vehicles
Wheeled reconnaissance vehicles
Tank destroyers of France
Military vehicles introduced in the 1990s